Cecil Day-Lewis  (or Day Lewis; 27 April 1904 – 22 May 1972), often written as C. Day-Lewis, was an Irish-born British poet and Poet Laureate from 1968 until his death in 1972. He also wrote mystery stories under the pseudonym of Nicholas Blake.

During World War II, Day-Lewis worked as a publications editor in the Ministry of Information for the U.K. government, and also served in the Musbury branch of the British Home Guard. He is the father of actor Sir Daniel Day-Lewis, and documentary filmmaker and television chef Tamasin Day-Lewis.

Life and work
Day-Lewis was born in 1904 in Ballintubbert, Athy/Stradbally border, Queen's County (now known as County Laois), Ireland. He was the son of Frank Day-Lewis, a Church of Ireland rector of that parish, and Kathleen Blake (née Squires; died 1906). Some of his family were from England (Hertfordshire and Canterbury). His father took the surname "Day-Lewis" as a combination of his own birth father's ("Day") and adoptive father's ("Lewis") surnames. 
In his autobiography The Buried Day (1960), Day-Lewis wrote, "As a writer I do not use the hyphen in my surname – a piece of inverted snobbery which has produced rather mixed results".

After the death of his mother in 1906, when he was two years old, Cecil was brought up in London by his father, with the help of an aunt, spending summer holidays with relatives in County Wexford. He was educated at Sherborne School and at Wadham College, Oxford. In Oxford, Day-Lewis became part of the circle gathered around W. H. Auden and helped him to edit Oxford Poetry 1927. His first collection of poems, Beechen Vigil, appeared in 1925.

In 1928, Day-Lewis married Constance Mary King, the daughter of a Sherborne teacher. Day-Lewis worked as a schoolmaster in three schools, including Larchfield School, Helensburgh, Scotland (now Lomond School). During the 1940s, he had a long and troubled love affair with the novelist Rosamond Lehmann. His first marriage was dissolved in 1951, and he married actress Jill Balcon, daughter of Michael Balcon. Day-Lewis met Jill at the recording of a radio programme in 1948 and began a relationship with her that year, despite being married to Mary. He continued simultaneous relationships with his married wife Mary who lived with their two sons in Dorset, unmarried mistress Lehmann who lived in Oxfordshire, and Jill who was his latest love. Day-Lewis eventually broke with both his wife and his mistress in order to be with Jill. But he was no more faithful to Jill than he had been with Mary or Rosamond. Jill's father was deeply unhappy about the scandalous affair since Jill was named publicly as co-respondent in Day-Lewis' divorce. He disinherited Jill and cut off all relationship with her and Day-Lewis. 

During the Second World War, he worked as a publications editor in the Ministry of Information, an institution satirised by George Orwell in his dystopian Nineteen Eighty-Four, but equally based on Orwell's experience of the BBC. During the Second World War, his work was less influenced by Auden and he was developing a more traditional style of lyricism. Some critics believe that he reached his full stature as a poet in Word Over All (1943), when he finally distanced himself from Auden. After the war, he joined the publisher Chatto & Windus as a director and senior editor.

In 1946, Day-Lewis was a lecturer at Cambridge University, publishing his lectures in The Poetic Image (1947). Day-Lewis became a Commander of the Most Excellent Order of the British Empire in the 1950 Birthday Honours. He later taught poetry at Oxford, where he was Professor of Poetry from 1951 to 1956. During 1962–1963, he was the Norton Professor at Harvard University. Day-Lewis was appointed Poet Laureate in 1968, in succession to John Masefield.

Day-Lewis was chairman of the Arts Council Literature Panel, vice-president of the Royal Society of Literature, an Honorary Member of the American Academy of Arts and Letters, a Member of the Irish Academy of Letters and a Professor of Rhetoric at Gresham College, London.

Cecil Day-Lewis died from pancreatic cancer on 22 May 1972, aged 68, at Lemmons, the Hertfordshire home of Kingsley Amis and Elizabeth Jane Howard, where he and his family were staying. As a great admirer of Thomas Hardy, he arranged to be buried near the author's grave at St Michael's Church in Stinsford, Dorset.

Day-Lewis was the father of four children. His first two children, with Constance Mary King, were Sean Day-Lewis (3 August 1931–9 June 2022), a TV critic and writer, and Nicholas Day-Lewis, who became an engineer. His children with Balcon were Tamasin Day-Lewis, a television chef and food critic, and Daniel Day-Lewis, who became an award-winning actor. Sean Day-Lewis wrote a biography of his father, C. Day-Lewis: An English Literary Life (1980).

Daniel Day-Lewis donated his father's archive of poetry to the Bodleian Library.

Nicholas Blake
In 1935, Day-Lewis decided to increase his income from poetry by writing a detective novel, A Question of Proof under the pseudonym Nicholas Blake. He created Nigel Strangeways, an amateur investigator and gentleman detective who, as the nephew of an Assistant Commissioner at Scotland Yard, has access to official crime investigations. He published nineteen further crime novels. (In the first Nigel Strangeways novel, the detective is modelled on W. H. Auden, but Day-Lewis developed the character as a far less extravagant and more serious figure in later novels.) From the mid-1930s, Day-Lewis was able to earn his living by writing. Four of the Blake novels – A Tangled Web, A Penknife in My Heart, The Deadly Joker, The Private Wound – do not feature Strangeways.

Minute for Murder is set against the background of Day-Lewis's Second World War experiences in the Ministry of Information. Head of a Traveller features as a principal character a well-known poet, frustrated and suffering writer's block, whose best poetic days are long behind him. Readers and critics have speculated whether the author is describing himself or one of his colleagues, or has entirely invented the character.

Political views
In his youth and during the disruption and suffering of the Great Depression, Day-Lewis adopted communist views, becoming a member of the Communist Party of Great Britain from 1935 to 1938. His early poetry was marked by didacticism and a preoccupation with social themes. In 1937, he edited The Mind in Chains: Socialism and the Cultural Revolution. In the introduction, he supported a popular front against a "Capitalism that has no further use for culture". He explains that the title refers to Prometheus bound by his chains, quotes Shelley's preface to Prometheus Unbound and says the contributors believe that "the Promethean fire of enlightenment, which should be given for the benefit of mankind at large, is being used at present to stoke up the furnaces of private profit". The contributors were: Rex Warner, Edward Upward, Arthur Calder-Marshall, Barbara Nixon, Anthony Blunt, Alan Bush, Charles Madge, Alistair Brown, J.D. Bernal, T.A. Jackson and Edgell Rickword.

After the late 1930s, which were marked by the widespread purges, repression, and executions under Josef Stalin in the Soviet Union, Day-Lewis gradually became disillusioned with communism. In his autobiography, The Buried Day (1960), he renounces former communist views. His detective novel, The Sad Variety (1964), contains a scathing portrayal of doctrinaire communists, the Soviet Union's repression of the 1956 Hungarian uprising, and the ruthless tactics of Soviet intelligence agents.

Selected works

Poetry

 Transitional Poem (1929)
 From Feathers to Iron (1931)
 Collected Poems 1929–1933 (1935)
 A Time to Dance and Other Poems (1935)
 Overtures to Death (1938)
 Short Is the Time (1945)
 Selected Poems (1951)
 Collected Poems (1954)
 Pegasus and Other Poems (1957)
 The Gate, and Other Poems (1962)
 The Whispering Roots and Other Poems (1970)
 The Complete Poems of C. Day-Lewis (1992)
 Editor (with L. A. G. Strong): A New Anthology of Modern Verse 1920–1940 (1941)
 Editor (with John Lehmann): The Chatto Book of Modern Poetry 1915–1955 (1956)

Essay collections
 A Hope for Poetry (1934)
 Poetry for You (1944)
 The Poetic Image (1947)

Translations
Virgil's Georgics (1940)
Paul Valéry's Le Cimetière Marin (1946)
Virgil's Aeneid (1952)
Virgil's Eclogues (1963)

Novels written under his own name

Novels
 The Friendly Tree (1936) 
 Starting Point  (1937)
 Child of Misfortune (1939)

Novels for children
 Dick Willoughby (1933)
 The Otterbury Incident (1948)

Novels written as Nicholas Blake

Nigel Strangeways
 A Question of Proof (1935); First US edition by Harper and Brothers (1935) 
 Thou Shell of Death (1936; First US edition by Harper and Brothers published as Shell of Death) (1936)
 There's Trouble Brewing (1937)
 The Beast Must Die (1938) adapted for the cinema by Román Viñoly Barreto in Argentina (1952) and by Claude Chabrol in France (1969), and in Britain in 2021 as The Beast Must Die (TV series).
 The Smiler with the Knife (1939). Serialised News Chronicle, 1939
 Malice in Wonderland (1940; also published as Murder with Malice. U.S. title: The Summer Camp Mystery)
 The Case of the Abominable Snowman (1941; also published as The Corpse in the Snowman)
 Minute for Murder (1947)
 Head of a Traveller (1949)
 The Dreadful Hollow (1953)
 The Whisper in the Gloom (1954; also published as Catch and Kill)
 End of Chapter (1957)
 The Widow's Cruise (1959)
 The Worm of Death (1961)
 The Sad Variety (1964)
 The Morning after Death (1966)

Non-series novels
 A Tangled Web (1956; also published as Death and Daisy Bland)
 A Penknife in My Heart (1958)
 The Deadly Joker (1963)
 The Private Wound (1968)

Short stories
 "A Slice of Bad Luck" (The Bystander, 1 December 1935. Reprinted in Detection Medley, ed. John Rhode [Hutchinson, 1939]. Also published as "The Assassin's Club". Reprinted in Murder by the Book, ed. Martin Edwards, 2021)
 "Mr Prendergast and the Orange" (Sunday Dispatch, 27 March 1938. Reprinted in Bodies from the Library, Volume 3, ed. Tony Medawar [2020]. Also published as "Conscience Money".)
 "It Fell to Earth" (The Strand Magazine, June 1944. Also published as "Long Shot". Reprinted in Murder at the Manor, ed. Martin Edwards, 2016)
 "The Snow Line" (The Strand Magazine, February 1949. Also published as "A Study in White" and "A Problem in White". Reprinted in Silent Night, ed. Martin Edwards, 2015)
 "Sometimes the Blind See the Clearest" (Evening Standard, 18 March 1963. Also published as "Sometimes the Blind". Reprinted in The Long Arm of the Law, ed. Martin Edwards,2017)

Radio plays
 Calling James Braithwaite. BBC Home Service, 20 and 22 July 1940. (Published in Bodies in the Library, Volume 1, ed. Tony Medawar [2018].)

Autobiography
 The Buried Day

Bibliography
Sean Day-Lewis, Cecil Day-Lewis: An English Literary Life (1980)

See also

List of Gresham Professors of Rhetoric

Notes

External links

 
Day-Lewis' poem 'Newsreel' read over footage from 1930s Pathe newsreels
C. Day Lewis, A Revised Bibliography, 1929–39 and Index of MSS Locations with Introductory Notes by Nick Watson, (a 65-page booklet, Radged Press, 2003)
The Volunteer – An ode to the International Brigade by Cecil Day Lewis

1904 births
Irish people of English descent
People from Stradbally
People educated at Sherborne School
Alumni of Wadham College, Oxford
Harvard University faculty
Academics of the University of Cambridge
Oxford Professors of Poetry
Professors of Gresham College
British Poets Laureate
Formalist poets
Irish poets
English mystery writers
Members of the Detection Club
Irish mystery writers
Commanders of the Order of the British Empire
Communist Party of Great Britain members
20th-century Irish novelists
20th-century Irish male writers
Irish male novelists
20th-century English poets
Irish male poets
1972 deaths
Deaths from cancer in England
Deaths from pancreatic cancer
Burials in Dorset
Translators of Virgil
British Home Guard soldiers
20th-century pseudonymous writers
Day-Lewis family